Bryobium eriaeoides, commonly known as the brittle urchin orchid, is an epiphytic or lithophytic clump-forming orchid that has fleshy, green pseudobulbs, each with two leaves and between three and twelve cup-shaped white to purplish flowers but that sometimes remain closed.  This orchid occurs in New Guinea and Queensland.

Description
The flowers are self-pollinating and open only slowly or not at all. The side lobes are erect and the middle lobe triangular with three ridges. Flowering occurs from August to October.

Taxonomy and naming
The brittle urchin orchid was first formally described in 1888 by Frederick Manson Bailey who gave it the name Dendrobium eriaeoides and published the description in A Synopsis of the Queensland Flora. In 2002 Mark Clements and David Jones changed the name to Bryobium eriaeoides. The specific epithet (eriaeoides) refers to the similarity of this species to those in the genus Eria. The ending -oides is a Latin suffix meaning "like", "resembling" or "having the form of".

Distribution and habitat
Bryobium eriaeoides grows on trees and rocks in humid situations. It is found in New Guinea and Queensland from the Iron Range to near Townsville.

References

eriaeoides
Orchids of New Guinea
Orchids of Queensland
Plants described in 1888